1248 Jugurtha is a stony background asteroid from the central regions of the asteroid belt, approximately  in diameter. Discovered by Cyril Jackson at the Union Observatory in 1932, the asteroid was named after Jugurtha, the ancient North African king of Numidia. The S-type asteroid is likely elongated in shape and has a rotation period of 12.9 hours.

Discovery 

Jugurtha was discovered on 1 September 1932, by South African astronomer Cyril Jackson at the Union Observatory in Johannesburg. On 29 September 1932, it was independently by Soviet astronomer Grigory Neujmin at the Simeiz Observatory on the Crimean peninsula. The Minor Planet Center only recognizes the first discoverer.

Orbit and classification 

Jugurtha is a non-family asteroid from the main belt's background population. It orbits the Sun in the central asteroid belt at a distance of 2.7–2.8 AU once every 4 years and 6 months (1,640 days; semi-major axis of 2.72 AU). Its orbit has an eccentricity of 0.02 and an inclination of 9° with respect to the ecliptic.

Naming 

This minor planet was named after Jugurtha (160–104 BC), a king of Numidia in North Africa, opposed to and defeated by Rome in the Jugurthine War (112–106 BC). The official  was mentioned in The Names of the Minor Planets by Paul Herget in 1955.

Physical characteristics 

In the SMASS classification, Jugurtha is a common, stony S-type asteroid.

Rotation period 

Several rotational lightcurves of Jugurtha were obtained from photometric observations since 2001. Analysis of the best-rated lightcurve gave a rotation period of  hours with a brightness amplitude between 0.70 and 1.40 magnitude, indicative of an elongated, non-spherical shape. A modeled lightcurve, using photometric data from the Lowell Photometric Database, gave a concurring period of 12.19047 hours, as well as a spin axis of (254.0°, −89.0°) in ecliptic coordinates (λ, β).

Diameter and albedo 

According to the surveys carried out by the Japanese Akari satellite and the NEOWISE mission of NASA's Wide-field Infrared Survey Explorer, Jugurtha measures between 27.46 and 33.559 kilometers in diameter and its surface has an albedo between 0.2073 and 0.282. The Collaborative Asteroid Lightcurve Link assumes a standard albedo for stony asteroids of 0.20 and calculates a diameter of 31.12 kilometers based on an absolute magnitude of 9.9.

Notes

References

External links 
 Lightcurve Database Query (LCDB), at www.minorplanet.info
 Dictionary of Minor Planet Names, Google books
 Asteroids and comets rotation curves, CdR – Geneva Observatory, Raoul Behrend
 Discovery Circumstances: Numbered Minor Planets (1)-(5000) – Minor Planet Center
 
 

001248
Discoveries by Cyril Jackson (astronomer)
Named minor planets
001248
19320901